The Black Pierrot is a 1913 German silent film directed by Harry Piel.

Cast
 Leontine Kühnberg
 Ludwig Trautmann

References

Bibliography

External links

1913 films
Films of the German Empire
Films directed by Harry Piel
German silent short films
German black-and-white films
1910s German films